In music, the vi–ii–V–I progression is a chord progression (also called the circle progression for the circle of fifths, along which it travels). A vi–ii–V–I progression in C major (with inverted chords) is shown below.

It is "undoubtedly the most common and the strongest of all harmonic progressions" and consists of "adjacent roots in ascending fourth or descending fifth relationship", with movement by ascending perfect fourth being equivalent to movement by descending perfect fifth due to inversion. For instance, in C major, the chords are Am–Dm–G–C, which have roots that descend by perfect fifth (or ascend by fourth), as shown below.

The circle progression is commonly a succession through all seven diatonic chords of a diatonic scale by fifths, including one progression by diminished fifth, (in C: between F and B) and one diminished chord (in C major, B), returning to the tonic at the end. A circle progression in C major is shown below.

Shorter progressions may be derived from this by selecting certain specific chords from the progression through all seven diatonic chords. The ii–V–I turnaround lies at the end of the circle progression, as does the vi–ii–V–I progression of root movement by descending fifths, which establishes tonality and also strengthens the key through the contrast of minor and major.

Examples 
Examples of vi–ii–V–I are shown below.

Pop songs that include the vi–ii–V–I progression include Weezer's "Island in the Sun", Gloria Gaynor's "I Will Survive", & Selena Gomez's "Love You Like A Love Song".

I−vi−ii−V

I−vi−ii−V is one of the most common chord progressions in jazz. The progression is often used as a turnaround, occurring as the last two bars of a chorus or section. The I−vi−ii−V chord progression occurs as a two-bar pattern in the A section of the rhythm changes, the progression based on George Gershwin's "I Got Rhythm" & Hillsong UNITED's "Hosanna". It can be varied as well: according to Mark Levine, "[t]oday's players usually play a dominant 7th chord rather than a minor 7th chord as the VI chord in a I-VI-II-V."

In the jazz minor scale, the diatonic progression below is possible.

{| class="wikitable" style="text-align:left; width:150px;"
| width="50%" |iM7       vi7
| width="50%" |ii7       V+7
|-
|CmM7  Am75
|Dm7   G713
|}

See also
Approach chord
Predominant chord
Dominant (music)
Extended dominant
Ragtime progression
Tadd Dameron turnaround

Sources

Chord progressions

de:Quintfallsequenz
fi:Jazzpiano#Kvinttiympyrä